Whitelocke is an English surname. Notable people with the name include:
Bulstrode Whitelocke (1605–1675), English lawyer and politician
Edmund Whitelocke (1565–1608), English soldier
James Whitelocke (1570–1632), English judge
John Whitelocke (1757–1833), British soldier

See also
Whitlock (surname)